Lilia Kha-Tu Du Vu (born October 14, 1997) is an American professional golfer. In 2021, she won three titles on the Symetra Tour.

Early life, college and amateur career
Vu made a series of successful appearances for the U.S. national Team and won the 2018 Curtis Cup, earning four points, and won the 2018 Espirito Santo Trophy in Ireland with Jennifer Kupcho and Kristen Gillman. She also won the 2018 Arnold Palmer Cup at Evian Resort Golf Club in France. Individually, she was runner-up at the 2014 AJGA Girls Championship behind Lauren Stephenson and won the 2016 Women's Southern California Amateur Championship. She was solo third at the SCGA Women's Amateur Championship and tied for third at the Canadian Women's Amateur.

Vu enrolled at UCLA in 2015. As a UCLA Bruin, she was awarded 2016 Pac-12 Conference Freshman of the Year, and in 2018 she was WGCA Player of the Year, Pac-12 Conference Golfer of the Year, and Honda Award finalist. She was also three-time WGCA First Team All-American and All-Pac 12 performer, and ranked first on the all-time UCLA career victory list with eight individual titles.

Vu played in the U.S. Women's Open and the ANA Inspiration as an amateur, and at the 2018 ANA Inspiration she was the low amateur with a score of 285 (−3). She was number one in the World Amateur Golf Ranking for a total of 31 weeks in 2018 and 2019. Her reign ended when she turned professional in January 2019.

Professional career
Vu turned professional in January 2019 and finished T27 at the inaugural LPGA Q-Series to earn status for the 2019 LPGA Tour, where she made one cut in nine starts.

In 2021, she won three titles on the Symetra Tour and rose into the top 250 in the Women's World Golf Rankings for the first time. In addition to winning the Garden City Charity Classic, the Twin Bridges Championship and the Four Winds Invitational, she also collected the 2021 Potawatomi Cup and bonus prize money. She finished the season first on the money list, winning Symetra Tour Player of the Year honors and earning her LPGA Tour card for 2022.

Amateur wins
2016 Women's Southern California Amateur Championship
2017 Battle at the Beach, Pac-12 Championship, Silverado Showdown, Anuenue Spring Break Classic, Bruin Wave Invitational
2018 Pac-12 Championship, Arizona Wildcat Invitational, Bruin Wave Invitational, Northrop Grumman Regional Challenge

Source:

Professional wins (4)

LPGA Tour wins (1)

Symetra Tour wins (3)

Results in LPGA majors
Results not in chronological order.

CUT = missed the half-way cut
NT = no tournament
T = tied

LPGA Tour career summary

^ Official as of February 26, 2023
*Includes matchplay and other tournaments without a cut.

World ranking
Position in Women's World Golf Rankings at the end of each calendar year.

^ as of February 27, 2023

U.S. national team appearances
Amateur
Curtis Cup: 2018 (winners)
Arnold Palmer Cup: 2018 (winners)
Espirito Santo Trophy: 2018 (winners)

References

External links

American female golfers
LPGA Tour golfers
UCLA Bruins women's golfers
Golfers from California
People from Fountain Valley, California
American sportspeople of Vietnamese descent
1997 births
Living people
20th-century American women
21st-century American women